Madame and Her Niece (German: Madame und ihre Nichte) is a 1969 West German drama film directed by Eberhard Schröder and starring Ruth-Maria Kubitschek, Edwige Fenech and Fred Williams. It is an adaptation of the 1884 short story Yvette by Guy de Maupassant updated to the modern era.

The film's sets were designed by the art director Hertha Hareiter.

Cast
 Ruth-Maria Kubitschek as Michelle 
 Edwige Fenech as Yvette 
 Fred Williams as Peter von Hallstein 
 Rainer Penkert as Jochen Reiter 
 Karl Walter Diess as Dr. Fink 
 Ini Assmann as Amelie 
 Valerie Antelmann as Sophie 
 E.O. Fuhrmann as Juwelier 
 Robert Naegele as Karl 
 Ann Hellstone as Karin 
 Isolde Lehner
 Hansi Lohmann as Masseuse 
 Laurence Bien
 Dean Finnie
 Frank Müller-May
 Thomas Hock
 Rudolph Moshammer as Modedesigner 
 Rosl Mayr as Garderobiere

See also
Yvette (1928)
Yvette (1938)

References

Bibliography
 Parish, Robert. Film Actors Guide. Scarecrow Press, 1977.

External links

1969 films
1960s erotic drama films
German erotic drama films
West German films
1960s German-language films
Films directed by Eberhard Schröder
Films based on short fiction
Films based on works by Guy de Maupassant
1969 drama films
1960s German films